Jeremy Gordon (born 20 January 1987) is a Canadian cricketer. He played for Canada in the 2014 Cricket World Cup Qualifier tournament.

On 3 June 2018, he was selected to play for the Vancouver Knights in the players' draft for the inaugural edition of the Global T20 Canada tournament. In June 2019, he was selected to play for the Toronto Nationals franchise team in the 2019 Global T20 Canada tournament.

In October 2019, he was named in Canada's squad for the 2019 ICC T20 World Cup Qualifier tournament in the United Arab Emirates.

References

External links
Jeremy Gordon at ESPNCricinfo

1987 births
Living people
Canadian cricketers
Canada One Day International cricketers
Canada Twenty20 International cricketers
Guyanese emigrants to Canada
Guyanese cricketers
Guyana cricketers
ICC Americas cricketers
People from New Amsterdam, Guyana
Afro-Guyanese people
Black Canadian sportspeople